Pepsi & Shirlie are an English pop duo group formed in London in 1985, which released two albums, All Right Now in 1987 and Change in 1991. Their debut single "Heartache" reached No. 2 in the UK Singles Chart.

Career
The act comprised Helen "Pepsi" DeMacque (born 10 December 1958, Paddington, London) and Shirlie Holliman (born 18 April 1962, Watford, Hertfordshire), who had been Wham! backing vocalists. Holliman's original singing partner, Dee C. Lee, had earlier left the group to join the Style Council and later married its lead vocalist Paul Weller.

Although DeMacque had ambitions to be a solo performer after Wham!, Holliman convinced her that it would be best to proceed as a duo.
 
In 1987, they released their debut single "Heartache", which was produced by Phil Fearon and Tambi Fernando and reached No. 2 in the UK Singles Chart. "Heartache" also peaked at number two on the American dance charts. Although featuring a credit for super producers Stock Aitken Waterman on many pressings of the single, "Heartache" was never worked on by the trio – with all additional production work and remixing done by Pete Hammond on behalf of Pete Waterman. 

The follow-up single, "Goodbye Stranger", produced by Fernando and Hammond, reached No. 9. Subsequent singles and their debut album All Right Now, released later in the year, were commercially unsuccessful. During this era, the act's tours included a concert performed in Amman, Jordan. 

In 1991, they returned with the album Change and its lead single "Someday", a song produced by George Michael. Holliman recalled Michael writing the song from scratch during the recording session, after accepting her request to help out with their comeback. Both the album and the single went unnoticed, not even charting in the UK.

DeMacque worked with Michael again in 1995, when the two pseudonymously released a cover of the Dead or Alive classic "You Spin Me Round (Like A Record)" under the name Infamy.

Pepsi & Shirlie returned in 2000 to record their backing vocals on Geri Halliwell's UK number one hit "Bag It Up". The duo also re-united for the "Here & Now 10th Anniversary tour" starting on 24 June 2011.

Their memoir It's All in Black and White was published by Welbeck in September 2021.

In popular culture
In the Only Fools and Horses episode "Danger UXD", Del has a box full of sex dolls. Due to their faulty valves, two of them (one black and one white) self-inflate. Del calls them "Pepsi & Shirlie."

In EastEnders, Shirley Carter says to Heather Trott that she wished Pepsi & Shirlie had drowned George Michael on the "Club Tropicana" video shoot. 

In I, Partridge – We Need to Talk About Alan, a spoof autobiography of the fictional broadcaster Alan Partridge published in 2011, Partridge claims either Pepsi or Shirlie (he cannot remember which) was responsible for triggering his Toblerone addiction.

Discography

Studio albums

Singles

References

External links
 [ Brief biography at Allmusic.com]
 Pepsi & Shirlie discography

Wham! members
English pop music duos
English pop girl groups
Female musical duos
Musical groups from London
Musical groups established in 1985